The Encyclopedia of Yugoslavia was the national encyclopedia of the Socialist Federal Republic of Yugoslavia. It was published by the Yugoslav Lexicographical Institute (Zagreb) under the direction of Miroslav Krleža. Lawrence S. Thompson reviewed the Encyclopedia so: The first volume (A-Bosk) of the new Encyclopedia of Yugoslavia deserves attention not only as an important general reference work on Yugoslavia but also for the very extensive attention devoted to libraries, historical bibliography, archives, and other related subjects.

Volumes

First edition 

The first edition consists of 8 volumes, issued from 1955 to 1971. It was printed in 30,000 copies.

Second edition 

Work on the second edition started in 1980, but was not finished due to the Yugoslav wars. Only 6 of 12 planned volumes appeared.

The main Serbo-Croatian Latin alphabet edition has been translated into 5 additional language-alphabet combinations:

The Macedonian and Albanian variants were the first encyclopedias published in the respective languages.

References 

 

Serbian-language encyclopedias
Slovenian encyclopedias
Hungarian encyclopedias
Albanian encyclopedias
Croatian encyclopedias
Yugoslav culture
Y
Books about Yugoslavia
Propaganda in Yugoslavia
Macedonian encyclopedias
20th-century encyclopedias
1955 non-fiction books
1988 non-fiction books
Area studies encyclopedias